Tetrahydrocannabiphorol (THCP) is a potent phytocannabinoid, a CB1 and CB2 agonist which was known as a synthetic homologue of THC, but for the first time in 2019 was isolated as a natural product in trace amounts from Cannabis sativa. It is structurally similar to Δ9-THC, the main active component of cannabis, but with the pentyl side chain extended to heptyl. Since it has a longer side chain, its cannabinoid effects are "far higher than Δ9-THC itself." Tetrahydrocannabiphorol has a reported binding affinity approximately 33 times that of Delta-9-THC.

Isomers

Delta-3-THCP

The Δ3/Δ6a(10a) isomer Δ3-THCP was synthesised in 1941, and was found to have around the same potency as Δ3-THC, unlike the hexyl homologue parahexyl which was significantly stronger.

Delta-8-THCP

The Δ8 isomer is also known as a synthetic cannabinoid under the code name JWH-091, It's unconfirmed whether or not Delta-8-THCP is found naturally in cannabis plants, but likely is due to Delta-8-THC itself being a degraded form of Delta-9-THC.  JWH-091 has approximately double the binding affinity at the CB1 receptor (22nM ± 3.9nM) in comparison to Delta-9-THC (40.7nM ± 1.7nM) or Delta-8-THC (44nM ± 12nM). but appears significantly lower in vitro than the binding activity of Delta-9-THCP (Ki = 1.2 nM CB1)

See also 
 CBD-DMH
 Delta-8-THC
 Hexahydrocannabinol
 HU-210
 JWH-138
 Parahexyl
 Perrottetinene
 Tetrahydrocannabivarin
 Tetrahydrocannabutol
 Tetrahydrocannabihexol
 O-1871
 DMHP
 Cannabicyclohexanol

References 

CB1 receptor agonists
Phytocannabinoids
Benzochromenes